Tsunami: The Aftermath is a 2006 American disaster drama television miniseries that dramatizes the events in the aftermath of the 2004 Indian Ocean earthquake and tsunami.

The miniseries was written by Abi Morgan and directed by Bharat Nalluri. It is a joint production of HBO and the BBC and stars Tim Roth, Chiwetel Ejiofor, Sophie Okonedo, Hugh Bonneville, Samrit Machielsen and Toni Collette. It was filmed in Phuket and Khao Lak, Thailand from April to June 2006. Phuket and Khao Lak were two of the worst hit areas in Thailand in the disaster.

Plot

Interweaving stories examine the personal tragedies of several characters. Ian and Susie Carter are a young English couple searching for their six-year-old daughter Martha who was swept away by the tsunami. At the same time, Englishwoman Kim Peabody and her son Adam are looking for James (Kim's husband and Adam's father) and John (Kim's son and Adam's older brother). Meanwhile Than, a Thai waiter has to cope with the loss of his family and village.

Apart from these survivors, there are several officials trying to cope with the situation. There is Tony Whittaker, an overwhelmed British consular official whose faith in the powers of bureaucracy is severely tested. Kathy Graham, an Australian aid worker for a Christian charity, tries to convince Whittaker to show a healthy contempt for the rules and try to help the people as best as he can. And, there is Nick Fraser, a journalist who is investigating the lack of prior warning and corruption following the disaster.

Cast

The Journalists
 Tim Roth as Nick Fraser
 Will Yun Lee as Chai
 Aure Atika as Simone
 Kate Ashfield as Ellen Webb

The Carters
 Chiwetel Ejiofor as Ian Carter
 Sophie Okonedo as Susie Carter
 Jazmyn Maraso as Martha Carter
 Savannah Loney as Eve, Martha's lookalike
 Jacek Koman as Peer, the Dutch doctor

The Diplomats
 Hugh Bonneville as Tony Whittaker
 Toni Collette as Kathy Graham
 Leon Ford as Joe Meddler, Whittaker's assistant

The Thai
 Samrit Machielsen as Than
 Poh Sursakul as Than's Grandmother
 Grirggiat Punpiputt as Dr. Pravat Meeko
 Glacian Jarusomboon as Dr. Boomers Potuk

The Peabodys
 Gina McKee as Kim Peabody
 George MacKay as Adam Peabody
 Morgan David Jones as John David Peabody
 Owen Teale as James Robert Peabody

Awards

59th Primetime Emmy Awards nominations
Outstanding Supporting Actress in a Miniseries or Movie (Toni Collette)
Outstanding Director for a Miniseries, Movie, or Dramatic Special (Bharat Nalluri)
Outstanding Sound Editing for a Miniseries, Movie, or Special
64th Golden Globe Awards nominations
Best Actor in a Miniseries or TV Film (Chiwetel Ejiofor)
Best Actress in a Miniseries or TV Film (Sophie Okonedo) 
Best Supporting Actress in a Series, Miniseries, or TV Film (Toni Collette)
Golden Nymph Awards Awards nominations
Best Actor in a Miniseries (Chiwetel Ejiofor) (won)
Best Actor in a Miniseries (Hugh Bonneville)
Best Actor in a Miniseries (Tim Roth)
Best Actress in a Miniseries (Toni Collette)
38th NAACP Image Awards nominations
Best Miniseries, TV Film, or Dramatic Special
Best Actor in a Miniseries, TV Film, or Dramatic Special (Chiwetel Ejiofor)
Best Actress in a Miniseries, TV Film, or Dramatic Special (Sophie Okonedo) (won)
British Academy Television Awards nominations
Best Sound Fiction/Entertainment (won)
Best Original Television Music (Alex Heffes)
Best Photography & Lighting Fiction/Entertainment (John de Borman)
Humanitas Prize
90 Minute Category (Abi Morgan)

Controversy
The filming used actual locations in Thailand that were devastated by the tsunami. Some victims and grief counselors protested the film, saying that it was too soon after the disaster and that the scenes depicting the tragedy could prove too traumatic. Others welcomed the production, saying it brought jobs and could actually help the healing process and raise awareness of the impact of the tsunami. There was also concern over the lack of focus on the Asian victims of the flood.

References

External links
 Official website at HBO
 
 "'Tsunami' sets off wave of concern" by the New York Daily News
 "Thais complain as BBC 'reopens tsunami wounds'" by Independent
 Review at Variety

2000s American television miniseries
2006 television films
2006 films
2000s British television miniseries
American films based on actual events
British films based on actual events
Films directed by Bharat Nalluri
Films scored by Alex Heffes
Television shows shot at Elstree Film Studios